Skútustaðahreppur (regionally also ) is a former rural municipality located in East Iceland, in Northeastern Region. Its seat is in the village of Reykjahlíð. In 2022 the municipality merged with Þingeyjarsveit under the name of the latter.

Geography 
Skútustaðir is one of the largest Icelandic municipalities. Its southern borders are represented by the northern site of the glacier of Vatnajökull. Its territory includes the lakes of Mývatn (in front of Reykjahlíð) and Öskjuvatn; and the volcanoes of Hverfjall, Askja, Krafla and Herðubreið.

Photogallery

References

External links 

Official website 

Former municipalities of Iceland
Northeastern Region (Iceland)
States and territories disestablished in 2022